Lapua is a town and municipality of Finland.

It is located next to the Lapua River in the region of South Ostrobothnia. The town has a population of 
The municipality is unilingually Finnish.

History
In the early 14th century, permanent settlement began to spread to the Lapuanjoki Valley. Residents came from, among other areas, the settlement center of Suur-Sastamala in Upper Satakunta, which had good land and water connections to the north. The focus of Ostrobothnia's settlement was initially on the lower reaches of the Kyrönjoki River. The proximity to the sea of the Kvarken area, which is rich in natural resources, was especially attractive. Lapua at that time had some Lapps who considered the region their wilderness area. The name Lapuan was probably given by the coastal Swedes precisely because of the Lapps who lived in the area.

The Battle of Lapua was fought between Swedish and Russian forces near the outskirts of the town on 14 July 1808 as part of the Finnish War.

Lapua is the seat of the Evangelical Lutheran Diocese of Lapua. The Lapua Cathedral, designed by Carl Ludvig Engel, was built in 1827. In the 1930s the radical anti-communist Lapua Movement was founded and named after the town.

Lapua State Cartridge Factory 
Lapua is also home to a large ammunition factory, which commenced operations in 1927 as the State Cartridge Factory. This factory was the primary supplier of ammunition to the Finnish Army during the Winter War and World War II. An explosion occurred in a warehouse of this factory on 13 April 1976, resulting in the deaths of 40 employees. The original site of the factory and the surviving buildings are now an arts centre, a library and a theater.

International relations

Twin towns — Sister cities
Lapua is twinned with:

  Hagfors, Sweden
  Hohenlockstedt, Germany
  Lantana, Florida, United States
  Rakvere, Estonia
  Kiskőrös, Hungary

Notable people
 Vilho Annala
 Anneli Jäätteenmäki
 Vihtori Kosola
 Teemu Mäki
 Esko Nikkari
 Jutta Urpilainen

See also
 Lapua Movement
 Finnish national road 19
 Blue Highway, an international tourist route

References

External links

Town of Lapua – Official website
History of Nammo Lapua Oy at lapua.com
Lapua WebCam provided by Media-Wolf
Vanhan Paukun Festivaali Music Festival at the Cultural Center Vanha Paukku.

 
Cities and towns in Finland